Marian Klamer (born in 1965 in Pirimapun, Papua province, Indonesia) is a linguist who specializes in Austronesian and Papuan languages. Her interests include the documentation of minority languages, Malay language varieties, linguistic typology, historical linguistics, and language contact.

Early life and education
Klamer was born in Pirimapun village in what is now Safan District, Asmat Regency, Papua province, Indonesia, and spent her childhood there. In 1990, she completed a Master's degree in General Linguistics at VU Amsterdam. She obtained her doctorate in 1994 on the basis of Kambera: a language of Eastern Indonesia.

Career and publications
Klamer conducts extensive linguistic research in eastern Indonesia. As of 2014, she is a professor at Leiden University. She is the author of 50 articles and a number of scientific publications, including grammatical descriptions of the Kambera, Teiwa, and Alor languages.

In 2019 Klamer was elected a member of the Royal Netherlands Academy of Arts and Sciences.

References

External links

Living people
1965 births
Academic staff of Leiden University
Linguists of Papuan languages
Linguists of Timor–Alor–Pantar languages
Linguists from the Netherlands
Linguists from Indonesia
Linguists of Austronesian languages
Members of the Royal Netherlands Academy of Arts and Sciences
Vrije Universiteit Amsterdam alumni